Boris Vasilievich Nikitin (5 March 1938 – 20 October 1984) was a Soviet freestyle swimmer. He had his best achievements in the 4 × 200 m relay, in which he set a world record in 1956, and won a bronze medal at the 1956 Summer Olympics and a gold medal at the 1958 European Aquatics Championships; his team finished eighths at the 1960 Olympics. Individually, he won a European silver medal in the 400 m freestyle in 1958, but did not reach the final in that event at the 1956 Olympics.

Between 1956 and 1962 he set five European records in the 4 × 200 m freestyle, 400 m freestyle and 400 m medley events. He won six national titles, in the 400 m (1956–1960) and 1500 m freestyle disciplines (1957).

References

1938 births
1984 deaths
Sportspeople from Tbilisi
Male freestyle swimmers from Georgia (country)
Soviet male freestyle swimmers
Olympic swimmers of the Soviet Union
Swimmers at the 1956 Summer Olympics
Swimmers at the 1960 Summer Olympics
Olympic bronze medalists for the Soviet Union
Olympic bronze medalists in swimming
World record setters in swimming
European Aquatics Championships medalists in swimming
Georgian people of Russian descent
Medalists at the 1956 Summer Olympics